Nieve Airport  is an airport serving Nieve in the pampa of Beni Department in Bolivia.

See also

Transport in Bolivia
List of airports in Bolivia

References

External links 
OpenStreetMap - Nieve Airport
OurAirports - Nieve Airport
FallingRain - Nieve Airport

Airports in Beni Department